Lake Braddock Secondary School (LBSS) in Burke, Virginia, United States, administered by Fairfax County Public Schools (FCPS), is one of three 7-12 secondary schools in Fairfax County; the other two are Hayfield SS and Robinson SS. Lake Braddock opened in 1973. Its mascot is a bruin, and the school colors are purple and gold.

History 
When opened in 1973, adjacent to the namesake reservoir, Lake Braddock drew its students from nearby Robinson Secondary School to the west and West Springfield High School to the south. At first, Lake Braddock was built without walls in most of its educational areas, as it was believed by the administrators of the era that students would learn better in an open environment. When school officials realized a school without walls was distracting to teenage students, temporary walls were installed around many classrooms in the late 1970s and early 1980s. This resulted in significant climate control problems throughout the building, most of which were left unfixed until the school was renovated.

Besides the "open classroom" approach, Lake Braddock, when it opened, also employed the "Forecast Five" approach, which was a "school within a school", or teams, of 150 students assigned to five teachers (math, English, science, social studies, special ed). On field trips, all 150 would go. These teams were later given names and colors.

Academics and statistics 
Lake Braddock Secondary School is a fully accredited secondary school based on standardized testing in Virginia. The average SAT score of a LBSS 12th grader in the 2012–2013 school year was 1674 out of 2400.

VDOE accreditation summary
The following table shows the passing rates of all Lake Braddock students in their respective years and academic subjects, as determined by the Virginia Department of Education.

Demographics

For the 2020-2021 school year, Lake Braddock's student body was 47.42 White, 20.56% Asian, 17.89% Hispanic, 7.12% African-American, and 7.01% of other races.

Athletics

Cross country 
The Lake Braddock cross country team has won ten girls' state championships and three boys' state championships. Combined, these teams have more championship titles than any other Lake Braddock sport. Both the boys' and the girls' teams won the state title in 1987. The girls' team won the state title in 2009 and the boys' team received 4th place in the state. In 2010, the boys' team took back-to-back Patriot District championships and the girls won the Northern Region championship. In 2012, the girls' team won the District and Regional championships. Both teams competed in the 2012 Virginia State championships, with the girls' team winning by 82 points, and the boys' team placing fourth. In both 2014 and 2015, the boys' team won the 6A Patriot conference, 6A Northern Region, and 6A Virginia State Championships. The girls were state runner-ups in 2014 and champions in 2015. In 2017, the girls' team won the 6A Patriot District, with the boys as runners-up. The boys' team won the 6A Northern Region, with the girl as runners-up, and both the girls' and boys' teams won the 6A Virginia State Championships.

Soccer
In 1987 the girls' varsity soccer team became the first soccer team in Virginia to go undefeated and win the State Title with a 20-0 record. They are also the only team in Virginia to win two back-to-back AAA state championships, in 2006 and 2007. The boys' soccer team has won the state championship several times, including a 5-0 victory over Hylton High in 1988 and other titles in 1982, 1989, and 1995.

Football 

The Bruins have a long-standing tradition of winning since 1973. They won district championships in 1992, 1995, 1996, 2001, 2009, 2010, 2011, 2012, 2013, 2014, 2016, 2017, and 2018. The team has been to the Virginia State playoffs as regional champions in 1995, 2001, 2009, and 2010, and went to the state finals in 2009.

In the 2007 season, the Bruins went on a seven-game winning streak after their first-week loss to Robinson. Their only other loss came to Northern Region runner-up West Springfield. The Bruins went 8-3 in the regular season in 2007 and made the playoffs for the first time since 2000. In 2009 the Bruins were the Patriot District and the Northern Region Champions and went 8-2 in the regular seasons, led by future Fordham QB and Virginia State Player of the Year Michael Nebrich. They made it to the playoffs, where they managed to beat Fairfax, defeat Robinson, redeem themselves against Woodson, and win a thrilling overtime game against Battlefield. They continued to the State Championship and were defeated by the Thomas Dale Knights, 35-21. In the first round of 2010 Division 6 playoff games, Lake Braddock easily defeated Langley, 34-10. In the second round of the 2010 Division 6 playoff games, after a stunning 17-3 first-half deficit, the Bruins overcame arch-rival Robinson with a 24-23 victory on their road to another Northern Region Championship Game, led by Michael Nebrich. Lake Braddock then advanced to the state semi-final after a 56-18 win over Chantilly High School. In an exciting rematch of the 2009 state semi-final playoff game, the Battlefield Bobcats, who had been defeated 27-24 in overtime by the Bruins the previous year, hung on to win a close 35-27 victory and advanced to win the state title. In the fall 2011 season, Lake Braddock had even wins and four losses and won another district title.

Baseball
The Lake Braddock baseball program has won 15 district championships (6 under head coach Dan Griel, 7 under head coach Jody Rutherford, 1 under head coach John Thomas, and 1 under head coach Johann Tiamson) and 10 regional championships (4 under Dan Griel, 3 under Jody Rutherford, 2 under John Thomas, and 1 under Johann Tiamson).

In 2012, the Lake Braddock varsity baseball team won both the Patriot District title and the Virginia State Championship. This was the first state championship and the best season record (26–3) in school history.

In 2019, the first year under head coach John Thomas, the Bruins won both the regional title and the state title, as well as matching the 26–3, school best, season record. This was the first state championship since 2012 and 2nd in school history.

Tennis
Lake Braddock tennis teams have achieved much success in recent years, becoming a perennial contender in the post-season tournaments. The boys' team holds the Patriot District titles from 2008 to 2013, and continued that streak in 2014, when the name was changed to the Patriot Conference. In 2014, the team won the 6A Region tournament, the first boys' tennis regional title for the school. The team had state appearances in 2010 and 2014, losing in the state semi-finals in 2010 to Deep Run HS, and winning the State tournament in 2014 over Langley High School, which was the first boys' tennis state title for Lake Braddock. Lake Braddock's website shows that the girls' tennis team won 48 of its 59 matches from 2015-2018.

Lake Braddock Theatre
The Lake Braddock Theatre program is currently in its 50th season, having been under the direction of R.L. Mirabal for most of that time. It has participated in the Cappie program since its inception in 1999, garnering 109 nominations and 26 awards. The theatre is represented in the International Thespian Society by troupe #4807, and contributes to the ITS festival in Lincoln, Nebraska every summer. LBT competes annually at the Virginia Theatre Association Conference.

Awards 
LBT has won the Virginia High School League Patriot District/Conference One-Act Play Championship twelve times (1996, 2000, 2005, 2011, 2012, 2014–2017, 2019, 2022, and 2023). Lake Braddock Theatre has advanced to the Regional level 21 times since 1996. In 2004, 2015 and 2018, LBT advanced to the State Festival in Charlottesville, Virginia. In 2018, they won the VHSL State One-Act Play Championship for Class 6A. LBT has won 26 Cappie Awards, which include Best Play, for the 2000 production of Dracula. The theater was invited to perform at the Fringe Festival in Edinburgh, Scotland, in 2003. Individual students have also received awards for their performances or technical expertise throughout the years.

Musical accomplishments

Several students from the Lake Braddock Music program have gone to conservatories and major schools of music, including four to the Juilliard School.

Bands

The Lake Braddock band program consists of five concert ensembles at the high-school level: Symphonic Band, Concert One, Concert Two, Concert Three and a specialty Jazz Band. The high school band program is conducted by Michael Luley and Brandon Gilbert. Roy Holder announced his retirement at the end of the 2010–2011 school year, after 30 consecutive years as honor band; every year since the award was created. The Symphonic Band has been awarded 38 consecutive superior ratings at the Virginia Band & Orchestra Association (VBODA) Festival since 1981, when the ratings system was first installed. The Lake Braddock Middle School bands consist of four concert ensembles; Wind Ensemble, Select Band, Cadet Band, and Bruin Band. These middle school bands are conducted by Krista Pezold, Michael Luley, and Brandon Gilbert.

Marching band

The Lake Braddock Marching Band of over 230 people is a subset of Lake Braddock Bands and is combined with the Color Guard, conducted by Michael Luley and assistant Jason Miller. The band has played the half-time show at Bruin football games for over 16 years. The band consistently wins awards at competitions every fall and has received a rating of Superior 39 times at the VBODA Marching Festival.

Color Guard

The Color Guard generally has about 20 members. Besides performing with the marching band in the fall, the guard performs an indoor performance in the spring, calling it "Spring Guard". In recent years, the Color Guard has been a main benefactor in the school's participation in the National Color Guard Invitational in Atlanta, Georgia.

Orchestras

Eight ensembles comprise the Lake Braddock Orchestra program. The middle school groups are Primo Orchestra, Concert Orchestra, String Ensemble, Chamber Orchestra, and the high school groups are Sinfonietta Orchestra, Concert Orchestra, Intermezzo, String Ensemble, and Symphony Orchestra. The current orchestra directors are Austin Isaac and Clayton Allen.

Chorus

The Lake Braddock Chorus consisted of five different choirs until the 2017–2018 school year. These were divided by skill level, and requirement of audition. The Men's Choir, Women's Vocal Ensemble and the female Freshmen in Bel Canto make up the non-auditioned choirs, and Select Women and Lake Braddock Singers make up the auditioned choirs. In 2017, Bel Canto and Women's Vocal Ensemble were combined.

The Lake Braddock Singers (formally known as Symphonic Chorale) is composed of sopranos, altos, tenors, and basses. Each of the vocal sections is divided into two subsections. The choir sings primarily a cappella music with exception to the major works concert. The group is encouraged by the director to be leaders within the full choir and help the non-auditioned choirs with their music.

Select Women is a traditional women's choir of approximately 35 10th-12th graders; this number varies from year to year. It is one of the two auditioned choirs at Lake Braddock. They sings in four parts, Soprano 1, Soprano 2, Alto 1, and Alto 2. Members of this group are expected to be leaders in the Choral program.  Select is also expected to help the non-auditioned choirs with their music when performing together during the major works concert.

An a cappella group formed in 2008, inspired by the pop a cappella groups of major colleges, including JMU Madison Project and Blues Tones organizations that perform yearly for the choir program at Lake Braddock. The group was founded by students and is managed by students as well.

The choirs have won many awards, including winning almost every category they entered in Nashville in 2006. In 2007, the choir performed in New York City near the site of the former World Trade Center buildings.  The choirs also have turned out several highly successful singers, including a quarter-finalist for American Idol, and several performers in musical theater.

Lake Braddock Secondary School's Musical Theatre is well known in Fairfax County. Every year the Lake Braddock Chorus and the Lake Braddock Theatre programs come together and produce a musical. The musical theatre has been around since 1975 and has produced shows such as Guys and Dolls; Thoroughly Modern Millie; Annie; Les Misérables; Cinderella; Annie, Get Your Gun; Hairspray; Beauty and the Beast. Rehearsals occur in the spring when the show airs to the public. Anyone can audition for a musical at Lake Braddock, and one does not have to be enrolled in the chorus or theatre classes in order to audition.

The director of the High School Chorus Program, Andrea Harmon, took over the program after former director Mary Demarco retired in the 2016–2017 school year. Harmon works with the director of the middle school Chorus Program, Mr. McClay.  Mr. Mirabal, the head of the Lake Braddock Theatre Program, is also involved in these performances. The Theatre program is responsible for tech in the show including the lighting, sound, and sets/set changes. Musicals at Lake Braddock Secondary School usually have five showings over the course of a weekend.

Lake Braddock clubs
Lake Braddock is home to over 70 clubs. The DECA Club has sent students to national level competitions. In September 2006, Lake Braddock started a boys' volleyball team. The Lake Braddock Speech Team was reorganized in 2006 and began to compete in the VHSL. The Lake Braddock Key Club is one of the school's biggest and most prosperous clubs; having over 400 members, they raised $5,300 for UNICEF in October 2012. The Lake Braddock Model United Nations Club is an active participant in local and national conferences. LBSS has one of the few active high school chapters of Students for a Democratic Society. The It's Academic team has been featured on WRC-TV multiple times. Lake Braddock provides crew (rowing) as a club sport. Lake Braddock Crew has medaled in many regattas, including state competitions. Lake Braddock also features an Army JROTC program, started in 2010, which currently has over 150 cadets.

Lake Braddock honor societies
Lake Braddock houses many honor societies including the Lake Braddock chapter of the National Honor Society, National Social Studies Honor Society, Spanish National Honor Society, French Honor Society, German Honor Society, National Art Honor Society, and many more. These actively work to improve the Lake Braddock community.

Lake Braddock student media

The Bear Facts
The Bear Facts is Lake Braddock's student news periodical with a circulation of about 3000 students and community members. It is student-run under the guidance of an adviser. Content decisions are governed by staff writers, editors, and any other students involved. Printed as a newspaper since its founding in 1973, it changed to a black and white/color news magazine format in 2013. The Bear Facts is a member of the Virginia High School League, the National Scholastic Press Association, and the Columbia Scholastic Press Association.

Controversy
In 2007, The Bear Facts had an advisory change over issues published in March 2007. Controversy arose on articles published on "homosexuality, trans sexuality and review of a documentary about bestiality," as well as its March 30 issue, which had carried a story on Post Secret, a website that posts anonymous contributors' secrets displayed on homemade postcards. The school released a statement that the dismissal was for "basic journalism" errors.

The Lair

The Lair is Lake Braddock's student-run yearbook, under the guidance of a faculty adviser. All design, writing, and editing is done entirely by students. One 300-page book and spring supplemental insert, printed by Herff Jones, are produced by a staff of about 70 each school year. The Lair is a member of the Virginia High School League, the National Scholastic Press Association, and the Columbia Scholastic Press Association. The 2015 book, Live Your Moment, was awarded a Columbia Scholastic Press Association Silver Crown and was a nominee for the National Scholastic Press Association Pacemaker Award. It is one of only 37 books in the country to achieve this feat. In 2011, the Lake Braddock Middle School started to produce their own book, the Ursa, instead of being a small portion of the high school book.

The Morning Bru

The Morning Bru is Lake Braddock's morning announcement show produced by the school's broadcast journalism class. They have recently expanded to extend coverage of the school and the Lake Braddock Community. Later, the Bruin Cave was established as a separate morning announcement show for the middle school students.

Lake Braddock Debate/Speech

The Lake Braddock Speech and Debate Team offers competition in Lincoln-Douglas Debate, Congressional Debate, and all standard individual events. The team is open to any student at Lake Braddock Secondary School, grade 7-12, who is in good academic standing. Team practices begin in the late summer, with competitions being held from October through Memorial Day weekend. The team has enjoyed great success in recent years, winning the 2011 NCFL National Championship in LD debate, four state individual VHSL State Champions in Debate, 10 VHSL State Championships in Speech, and multiple other awards at VHSL, NCFL, and NSDA Nationals.

Incidents

On February 19, 1975, a bomber exploded a tear gas canister in a stairwell, sending 65 students to the school clinic and one student to the hospital for eye irritation.

On May 28, 1979, an electrical panel fire forced the school to be closed for the remainder of the school year.

On November 11, 1982, a dropout looking for his girlfriend held a group of ten employees, including the principal, hostage with a rifle for 21 hours.

In 1990, a man set fire to Lake Braddock Secondary School and two other schools. The total damage among all the schools was $200,000.

In April and May 1994, there were two incidents of 13-year-olds bringing guns to school.

On September 23, 1994, two teenagers were shot by a gang member after a Lake Braddock football game.

On March 23, 2015, a bomb threat was sent to several teachers early in the morning, resulting in the closure of the school. The threat was determined to be a hoax after police swept the building and found nothing.

On April 20, 2016, a 16-year-old student was found unresponsive in a bathroom at around 6:00 p.m. The student was then taken to Inova Fairfax Hospital, where she was pronounced dead.

In 2018 the principal, Dave Thomas, retired after a report of his handling of a sexual harassment scandal at the school by the Washington Post and later WUSA9. Daniel Smith became the principal after Thomas retired.

Renovations

The school finished a three-year renovation in the summer of 2007, beginning right after school ended in June 2004. The renovations cost taxpayers around $72 million - a record for Fairfax County Public Schools. Fifty-two classroom trailers were installed on campus to accommodate the construction.  Other than expanding the school and refurbishing the building, two main goals of the project were to repair an overhaul of the ventilation system and enclose classrooms with permanent walls. Samaha Associates, P.C. were the architects for Lake Braddock's renovation, which is now seen as a model for other renovation projects in Fairfax County, such as the renovation of nearby W.T. Woodson High School.

Notable alumni

 Yousef Abu-Taleb (class of 1998), actor
 Sanju Bansal, founding partner of MicroStrategy
 Tal Bayer (class of 1988), founding member of the Pietasters 
 Adam Butler, former MLB player (Atlanta Braves)
 Ann Marie Calhoun (class of 1997), violinist
 Julia Campbell (class of 1979), actress; has appeared on television shows such as Friends and Seinfeld
 Matthew Continetti (class of 1999), author; journalist; frequent contributor on the MSNBC television show Hardball with Chris Matthews
 Hubert Davis (class of 1988), played 12 seasons in the NBA; Head coach for the UNC men's basketball team
 Chad Dukes (class of 1997), co-host of sports radio show Chad Dukes vs. The World on WJFK 106.7FM in Washington, D.C.; born Chad Sisson
 Tiffany Dupont (class of 1999), actress; appeared in "The Bedford Diaries" on The CW. in Grounded For Life, Yes, Dear, Joan of Arcadia, and Greek
 Sonjay Dutt (class of 2000), professional wrestler; born Retesh Bhalla
 Greg Eklund (class of 1988), drummer and guitarist; member of the alternative rock band Everclear, 1994–2003; member of the rock band The Oohlas, 2004–present; brother of Mark Eklund
 Tom Goodin (class of 1988), founding member of the Pietasters
 Mia Hamm (class of 1989), professional women's soccer player, World Cup winner, and Olympic gold medalist
 Allen Johnson (class of 1989), track and field star; Olympic gold medalist; namesake of the school's track and annual outdoor track and field invitational
 Dan Leal, (class of 1987), American pornographic director and actor, also known in the industry as Porno Dan
 Glennon Doyle Melton (class of 1994) author of Carry On, Warrior and Love Warrior
 Travis Morrison (class of 1990), founding member and vocalist/guitarist for The Dismemberment Plan; member of Travis Morrison Hellfighters
 Ed Moses (class of 1998), swimmer and Olympic gold medalist
 Ryan Newell (class of 1990), lead guitarist for rock band Sister Hazel
 Chris Segal, Major League Baseball umpire
 Mary Simpson, professional violinist with Yanni
 Justin Spring (class of 2002), gymnast; member of United States 2008 Olympic gymnastics team
 Susan Williams (class of 1987), Olympic bronze medalist in the triathlon, 2004

References

External links
Lake Braddock Secondary School
Lake Braddock Sports
Lake Braddock Crew
Lake Braddock Band
Lake Braddock Orchestra
Lake Braddock Theatre
Lake Braddock Chorus

Public high schools in Virginia
Secondary schools in Fairfax County, Virginia
Northern Virginia Scholastic Hockey League teams
Educational institutions established in 1973
Public middle schools in Virginia
1973 establishments in Virginia